The lowland tiny greenbul (Phyllastrephus debilis), is a species of songbird in the bulbul family, Pycnonotidae.
It is found in eastern Africa. Its natural habitats are subtropical or tropical moist lowland forest and subtropical or tropical moist shrubland.

Taxonomy and systematics
The lowland tiny greenbul was originally described in the genus Xenocichla (a synonym for Bleda). Until 2009, the montane tiny greenbul was considered as conspecific with the lowland tiny greenbul as the tiny bulbul. Some authorities continue to consider the two species as conspecific.

Subspecies
Two subspecies are recognized:
 Rabai yellow-streaked bulbul (P. d. rabai) - Hartert & van Someren, 1921: Found in south-eastern Kenya and north-eastern Tanzania   
 North Nyasa yellow-streaked bulbul (P. d. debilis) - (Sclater, WL, 1899): Also named the smaller yellow-streaked bulbul. Found in south-eastern Tanzania to eastern Zimbabwe and southern Mozambique

References

External links
 Lowland tiny greenbul - Species text in The Atlas of Southern African Birds.

Phyllastrephus
Greenbuls
Birds of East Africa
Birds described in 1899
Taxa named by William Lutley Sclater
Taxonomy articles created by Polbot